This is a list of museums in Bahrain.

Museums in Bahrain
Bahrain Military Museum
Bahrain National Museum
Bait Shaikh Salman Historic Palace
Beit Al Quran
Busaad Art Gallery
Maison Jamsheer
Mohammed Bin Faris House of Sout Music
Museum of Pearl Diving
Dar al-Naft Oil Museum
Shaikh Ebrahim Center

See also

 Culture of Bahrain

References	

Bahrain education-related lists

Lists of buildings and structures in Bahrain
Bahrain
Museums
Bahrain